Joseph Barbato (born 11 August 1994) is a French professional footballer who plays as a forward for Furiani.

Career
In January 2019, he returned to Furiani.

Club statistics

Notes

References

External links
 
 

1994 births
Living people
French footballers
Association football forwards
Ligue 1 players
Ligue 2 players
Championnat National players
SC Bastia players
US Colomiers Football players
Borgo FC players
AS Furiani-Agliani players
FC Bastia-Borgo players
ÉF Bastia players
Corsica international footballers
Footballers from Corsica